Arlette and Love (French: Arlette et l'amour) is a 1943 French romantic comedy film directed by Robert Vernay and starring André Luguet, Josette Day and André Alerme.

The film's sets were designed by the art director Robert Giordani.

Cast 
 André Luguet as Le vrai comte Raoul de Tremblay-Matour
 Josette Day as Arlette Milloix
 André Alerme as Le baron Gingleux
 René Alié as Le faux comte de Tremblay-Matour
 Jean Aquistapace as Le curé
 Andrée de Chauveron as Mme Millois – la mère d'Arlette
 Alexandre Fabry as L'aubergiste
 Jimmy Gaillard as Maxime Noblet
 Albert Gercourt as Gilbert
 Pierre Labry as Jules – le domestique
 René Lefèvre as Le notaire
 Robert Moor as Mathurin
 Henri Poupon as Breteuil
 Sylvette Saugé as Sylvie
 Jean Toulout as Le comte de Brulant

References

Bibliography 
 Dayna Oscherwitz & MaryEllen Higgins. The A to Z of French Cinema. Scarecrow Press, 2009.

External links 
 

1943 films
French romantic comedy films
1943 romantic comedy films
1940s French-language films
Films directed by Robert Vernay
Gaumont Film Company films
French films based on plays
French black-and-white films
1940s French films